Alice Baker may refer to:

Alice Baker (veteran) (1898–2006), British World War I service veteran
Alice Baker (set decorator)
Alice Graham Baker (1864–1932), founder Houston Settlement Association

See also
Louisa Alice Baker (1856–1926), English-born New Zealand journalist and novelist